is a multi-use stadium in north-west area of Kashiwa, Japan. It is currently used mostly for football matches and rugby union. The stadium holds 20,000 people and was built from 1995, and served from 1999.

It's defined as one of home ground of Kashiwa Reysol (J.League club), but most of Reysol supporters reject using this stadium, because of worse condition than Hitachi Kashiwa Soccer Stadium, in points of accessibility (see the table below) and watching games from back-end and side stands. And, J.League match (except cup tournaments) hasn't been held in this stadium since 2009 season.

On November 18, 2007 it was used for a Top League rugby game between NEC Green Rockets and Mitsubishi Sagamihara DynaBoars.

Access from Kashiwa Station by public transports

References

External links 
J. League stadium guide 
Kashiwa Reysol stadium guide 

Football venues in Japan
Rugby union stadiums in Japan
Kashiwa Reysol
Sports venues in Chiba Prefecture
Kashiwa
Sports venues completed in 1999
1999 establishments in Japan